Ottelia alismoides, commonly known as duck lettuce, is a species of aquatic plant native to Asia and northern Australia.

References

External links 
 
 

Flora of Korea
Monocots of Australia
alismoides